The Nilgiri marten (Martes gwatkinsii) is the only marten species native to southern India. It lives in the hills of the Nilgiris and parts of the Western Ghats. With only around a thousand members left it is listed as Vulnerable on the IUCN Red List.

Description

The Nilgiri marten is deep brown from head to rump, with the forequarters being almost reddish, with a bright throat ranging in colour from yellow to orange. It has a prominent frontal concavity and is larger than the yellow-throated marten.

Distribution and habitat
The Nilgiri marten mainly inhabits the shola grassland and high altitude evergreen forests, and occasionally the adjacent mid-altitude moist deciduous forests and commercial plantations, that span the Western Ghats in the South Indian states of Karnataka, Kerala, and Tamil Nadu. The marten's English common name is derived from the Nilgiri Hills that form the center of its range, but sightings have been reported as far north as Charmadi Ghat and as far south as the Neyyar and Peppara Wildlife Sanctuaries.

The species is named after the collector Reynolds Gwatkins who gave a specimen to Colonel W.H. Sykes and was described by Thomas Horsfield from the skin in the museum of the East India Company.

Ecology and behaviour

The Nilgiri marten is diurnal. It is mainly arboreal, but descends to the ground occasionally. It is omnivorous and preys on birds, small mammals and insects such as cicadas. It has also been observed feeding on a variety of fruits and seeds.

References

External links

 Photographs: Close encounters in the wild
 NilgiriMarten.com (archived 26 December 2009)

Nilgiri marten
Mammals of India
Fauna of Tamil Nadu
Fauna of the Western Ghats
Endemic fauna of the Western Ghats
Nilgiri marten